The 2000 WNBA season was the 1st season for the Miami Sol.

Offseason

Expansion Draft

WNBA Draft

Trades

Regular season

Season standings

Season schedule

Player stats

References

Miami Sol seasons
Miami
Miami Sol